Statistics of Úrvalsdeild in the 1964 season.

Overview
It was contested by 6 teams, and Keflavík won the championship. ÍA's Eyleifur Hafsteinsson was the top scorer with 10 goals.

League standings

Results
Each team played every opponent once home and away for a total of 10 matches.

References

Úrvalsdeild karla (football) seasons
Iceland
Iceland
Urvalsdeild